Coprosma petriei, commonly mirrorplant, is a mat-forming shrub native to New Zealand. It is a hardy wind pollinated plant that is 0.1 m (4 in) by 0.5 m (20 in). Seeds mature in August and the plants only produce either male or female seeds; they are not self-fertilizing.

References

petriei
Endemic flora of New Zealand
Taxa named by Thomas Frederic Cheeseman